Brian Charles Thornton (born April 22, 1985) is an American volleyball player. He played for the 2007 NCAA national champions, the University of California, Irvine. He plays for the United States national team and appeared in the 2012 Summer Olympics.

Career

College
Thornton played volleyball for UC Irvine from 2004 to 2007. In 2004, he played 16 games, averaging 9.31 set assists. The following season, he averaged 12.57 set assists and had 1,320. Thornton then had 1,548 set assists in 2006. His 13.70 average led the nation. He also made the All-American second team.

In 2007, Thornton helped UC Irvine win the NCAA Division I men's volleyball national championship. He averaged 13.27 set assists, and he made the All-American second team and the NCAA All-Tournament team. Thornton's 1,645 assists that season was a new school record. His 4,662 career set assists was also a school record.

International
Thornton joined the U.S. national team in 2009. He helped the team win gold medals at the 2009 and 2010 Pan American Cups.

In 2011, Thornton played in the FIVB World League, NORCECA Men's Continental Championship, and FIVB World Cup. He averaged 5.19 assists per set, and his 514 assists was the most of any U.S. setter that year. At the 2012 Summer Olympics, Thornton had two points.

Thornton played professionally in France in 2010-11.

Personal
Thornton was born in Huntington Beach, California, on April 22, 1985. He attended San Clemente High School. Thornton is 6 feet, 3 inches tall and weighs 187 pounds. He has two younger siblings.

References

1985 births
Living people
Olympic volleyball players of the United States
Volleyball players at the 2012 Summer Olympics
UC Irvine Anteaters men's volleyball players
Sportspeople from Huntington Beach, California
American expatriates in France
Jastrzębski Węgiel players
American men's volleyball players